The President of Kazakhstan is the head of state elected by popular vote to serve a five-year-term. The president appoints the Prime Minister of Kazakhstan (head of government) and first deputy prime minister.

Leaders of the Kazakh Khanate (Khans) (1465–1874)

Leaders of Kazakhstan (1917–1990)

Alash Autonomy (1917–1920)

Kirghiz Autonomous Socialist Soviet Republic (1920–1925)

Kazakh Autonomous Soviet Socialist Republic (1925–1936)

Kazakh Soviet Socialist Republic (1936–1991)

First Secretary of the Communist Party

Head of state

Presidents of the Republic of Kazakhstan (1990–present)

Officeholder 
 Until 16 December 1991 was called President of the Kazakh Soviet Socialist Republic.

See also
Politics of Kazakhstan
President of Kazakhstan
Prime Minister of Kazakhstan
Vice President of Kazakhstan

References

External links
Kazakhstan President Official Site
 Kazakhstan President Nazarbayev Biography

Presidents
Government of Kazakhstan